Suputtra Beartong (born 31 August 1994) is a Thai female sepak takraw player. She represented Thailand at the 2018 Asian Games and was part of the Thai women's squad which clinched gold in the regu event.

References 

1994 births
Living people
Suputtra Beartong
Sepak takraw players at the 2018 Asian Games
Medalists at the 2018 Asian Games
Suputtra Beartong
Asian Games medalists in sepak takraw
Suputtra Beartong
Sepak takraw players
Suputtra Beartong